In molecular biology, hemagglutinins (or haemagglutinin in British English) (from the Greek , 'blood' + Latin , 'glue') are receptor-binding membrane fusion glycoproteins produced by viruses in the Paramyxoviridae family. Hemagglutinins are responsible for binding to receptors on red blood cells to initiate viral attachment and infection. The agglutination of red cells occurs when antibodies on one cell bind to those on others, causing amorphous aggregates of clumped cells.Hemagglutinins recognize cell-surface glycoconjugates containing sialic acid on the surface of host red blood cells with a low affinity, and use them to enter the endosome of host cells. In the endosome, hemagglutinins are activated at a pH of 5 - 6.5 to undergo conformational changes that enable viral attachment through a fusion peptide.

Agglutination and hemagglutinins were discovered by virologist George K. Hirst in 1941. Alfred Gottschalk proved in 1957 that hemagglutinins bind a virus to a host cell by attaching to sialic acids on carbohydrate side chains of cell-membrane glycoproteins and glycolipids.

Types
 Influenza hemagglutinin or haemagglutinin: a homotrimeric glycoprotein that is found on the surface of influenza viruses which is responsible for their infectivity.
 Measles hemagglutinin: a hemagglutinin produced by the measles virus which encodes six structural proteins, of which, hemagglutinin and fusion are surface glycoproteins involved in attachment and entry.
 Parainfluenza hemagglutinin-neuraminidase: a type of hemagglutinin-neuraminidase produced by parainfluenza which is closely associated with both human and veterinary disease.
 Mumps hemagglutinin-neuraminidase: a kind of hemagglutinin that the mumps virus (MuV) produces, which is the virus that causes mumps.
 The PH-E form of phytohaemagglutinin.

Structure
Hemagglutinins are small proteins that project from the virus membrane surface as 135 Å long spikes with a diameter of 30-50 Å. Each spike is made up of three identical monomer subunits, making the protein a homotrimer. These monomers are formed of two glycopeptides, HA1 and HA2, and linked by two disulphide polypeptides including membrane-distal HA1 and the smaller membrane-proximal HA2. X-Ray crystallography and spectroscopy were used to identify that the majority of the protein structures is made of α-helical proteins. In addition to the homotrimeric core structure, hemagglutinins have four subdomains: the membrane-distal receptor binding R subdomain, the vestigial domain E, that functions as a receptor-destroying esterase, the fusion domain F, and the membrane anchor subdomain M. The membrane anchor subdomain forms elastic protein chains linking the hemagglutinin to the ectodomain.

Uses in serology
 HIA (Hemagglutination Inhibition Assay): is a serologic assay which can be used either to screen for antibodies using RBCs with known surface antigens, or to identify RBCs surface antigens such as viruses or bacteria using a panel of known antibodies. This method, performed first by George K. Hirst in 1942, consists of mixing virus samples with serum dilutions so that antibodies bind to the virus before RBCs are added to the mix. Consequently, those viruses bound to antibodies are unable to link RBCs, meaning that a test’s positive result due to hemagglutination has been inhibited. On the contrary, if hemagglutination occurs, the test will result negative.

 Hemagglutination blood typing detection: this method consists of measuring both blood’s reflectance spectrum alone (non-agglutination), and that of blood mixed with antibody reagents (agglutination) using a waveguide-mode sensor. As a result, some differences in reflectance between the samples are observed. Once antibodies are added, blood types and Rh(D) typing can also be determined thanks to the waveguide-mode sensor. This technique is able to detect weak agglutinations, which are almost impossible to detect with human eyes.
 Using anti-A and anti-B antibodies that bind specifically to either the A or to the B blood group surface antigens on RBCs, it is possible to test a small sample of blood and determine the ABO blood group (or blood type) of an individual. It does not identify the Rh(D) antigen (Rh blood type).
 The bedside card method of blood grouping relies on visual agglutination to determine an individual's blood group. The card contains dried blood group antibody reagents fixed onto its surface. A drop of the individual's blood is placed on each blood group area on the card. The presence or absence of flocculation (visual agglutination) enables a quick and convenient method of determining the ABO and Rhesus status of the individual. As this technique depends on human eyes, it is less reliable than the blood typing based on waveguide-mode sensors.
 The agglutination of red blood cells is used in the Coombs test in diagnostic immunohematology to test for autoimmune hemolytic anemia.
 In the case of red blood cells, transformed cells are known as kodecytes. Kode technology exposes exogenous antigens on the surface of cells, allowing antibody-antigen responses to be detected by the traditional hemagglutination test.

See also
 Cold agglutinin disease
 Hemagglutination assay
 Neuraminidase
 Influenza hemagglutinin (HA)
 Agglutination

References

External links
 

Hematology
Immunologic tests